Wang Nuea is the northernmost district (amphoe) of Lampang province, northern Thailand.

Geography

Neighboring districts are (from the east clockwise) Mae Chai and Mueang Phayao of Phayao province, Ngao, Chae Hom and Mueang Pan of Lampang Province, Wiang Pa Pao and Phan of Chiang Rai province.

Mountains dominate the landscape of the district, the Khun Tan Range on the western side and the Phi Pan Nam Range on the eastern.

History
Till 1904 the district Chae Hom was named Wang Nuea. A new minor district (king amphoe) Wang Nuea was established on 15 May 1938 as a subordinate of Chae Hom district. It was upgraded to a full district in 1958.

Administration

Central administration 
Wang Nuea is subdivided into eight subdistricts (tambons), which are further subdivided into 80 administrative villages (mubans).

Local administration 
There are two subdistrict municipalities (Thesaban Tambons) in the district:
 Ban Mai consisting of parts of subdistrict Wang Nuea.
 Wang Nuea consisting of parts of subdistrict Wang Nuea.

There are eight subdistrict administrative organizations (SAO) in the district:
 Thung Hua consisting of subdistrict Thung Hua.
 Wang Nuea consisting of parts of subdistrict Wang Nuea.
 Wang Tai consisting of subdistrict Wang Tai.
 Rong Kho consisting of subdistrict Rong Kho.
 Wang Thong consisting of subdistrict Wang Thong.
 Wang Sai consisting of subdistrict Wang Sai.
 Wang Kaeo consisting of subdistrict Wang Kaeo.
 Wang Sai Kham consisting of subdistrict Wang Sai Kham.

References

External links
amphoe.com (Thai)

Wang Nuea